The Jordan Times is an English-language daily newspaper based in Amman, Jordan.

History
Established in 1975, The Jordan Times is owned by the Jordan Press Foundation, a shareholding company which also runs the Arabic-language daily Al Ra'i, the kingdom's best-selling newspaper.

The Jordan Press Foundation has been majority government-owned since its inception, but it is unclear how much the government's stake has fallen since 2000, when a plan to sell some of the Foundation's shares was announced. The Jordan Times maintains editorial independence from its sister daily Al Ra'i.

Content and profile
The newspaper includes two main sections:
 News: Covers local, regional, and world news, and includes subsections on business and sports.
 Opinions: Features opinion commentary and analysis by Jordanian, Arab, and international writers.
The paper's website was the 31st most visited website in the Arab world in 2013.

Alumni
Notable journalists who have worked at The Jordan Times include:
Rami George Khouri, journalist and commentator on the Middle East. Former editor-in-chief. 
Jill Carroll, Christian Science Monitor reporter kidnapped in Iraq. Former reporter.
Marwan Muasher, former minister of information. Former editor-in-chief. 
George Hawatmeh, founder of the Arab Media Institute. Former editor-in-chief.
Ayman Safadi, Jordan's foreign minister. Former deputy prime minister and editor-in-chief.

From the 1980s to 2011 veteran journalist Randa Habib had a weekly column in The Times which was stopped by the paper's management.

References

1976 establishments in Jordan
Publications established in 1976
English-language newspapers published in Arab countries
Newspapers published in Jordan
Mass media in Amman